Kiah Creek, a shortened version of "Hezekiah's Creek", is a major tributary of the East Fork of Twelvepole Creek in Lincoln and Wayne counties, West Virginia.

Geography

Kiah Creek originates in Lincoln County. Its largest tributaries are Francis Fork/Creek, Rollem Fork, Trough Fork, Big Laurel Fork, and Cove Fork/Creek. Its entire headwaters are located in Lincoln County, while its lower regions lie in Wayne County.

History

Anglo settlers arrived on Kiah Creek prior to 1820. Among the earliest families were Wileys, Maynards, and Queens.

During the Civil War, Big Laurel Fork hosted a skirmish between Union Colonel George W. Gallup's 14th Regiment Kentucky Volunteer Infantry (275 foot soldiers) and 39th Regiment Kentucky Volunteer Infantry (150 mounted soldiers) and Confederate Colonel Milton J. Ferguson's 16th Virginia Cavalry. Fought on the morning of 15 February 1864, Gallup's troops won a victory over Ferguson's surprised rebels, killing 10, wounding several, and releasing 16 federal prisoners. Additionally, Gallup's Kentuckians captured Col. Ferguson, his surgeon, two lieutenants, and 38 non-commissioned officers and privates.

Since 1869, at least four post offices have been located on or in the vicinity of Kiah Creek. On 17 May 1869, Walter Queen became postmaster of Cove Creek Post Office. This post office was discontinued in 1912. On 10 January 1877, John McCoy became postmaster at Cove Gap Post Office, situated in the head of Cove Creek/Fork. This post office was discontinued sometime after 1921. On 16 June 1884, Joshua Queen became postmaster of Kiahsville Post Office. Kiahsville Post Office still exists. On 16 June 1884, Louis Queen became postmaster of Queens Ridge Post Office. This post office was discontinued after 1917.

Economy

From the earliest of times, timbering served as the creek's major industry. After the Civil War, large-scale timbering permeated the creek. Since the twentieth century, Kiah Creek has hosted major coal mining activity.

Religion

The New Salem Old Regular Baptist Church is located on Big Laurel Fork of Kiah Creek.
The Kiah's Creek [United Baptist] Church was formed and located on Kiah's Creek for over a hundred years.  The church was formed in 1848 and was a founding church of two different United Baptist Associations that offered religious services in the area: Zion Association in 1848, and then Bethlehem which came out of Zion, in 1871.  The Kiah's Creek Church started with less than thirty members but had well over 200 members by the 1970s.  As of 2019 it has about 30 members once more.  The current location of the church is in Lincoln County, having moved there when the East Lynn Lake was put in, and the old property sold to the government.  
The Kiah's Creek and surrounding churches (oftentimes named after the creek or area) have been active in these areas for over a hundred years.  Many of them originated in the Bethlehem Association of United Baptists.  
The pronunciation of the church and creek is "Car's Creek" in the older vernacular.

Recreation

The lower portion of Kiah Creek constitutes a portion of East Lynn Lake.

See also
List of rivers of West Virginia

References

Rivers of Lincoln County, West Virginia
Rivers of West Virginia